Italy has participated in all editions of the Summer Universiade held since the first edition of 1959 Summer Universiade.

Medal count
Italy won 641 medals at the Summer Universiade.

Athletics

Italy won 47 gold medals, 45 silver and 57 bronze until 2017 Summer Universiade.

See also 
Italy at the Olympics
Italy at the Paralympics
Italy at the Mediterranean Games

References

External links
 FISU History at the FISU

 
Nations at the Universiade
Student sport in Italy